The Wisconsin Badgers women's volleyball is the volleyball team representing the University of Wisconsin–Madison in the NCAA Division I women's program. The university has a rich volleyball tradition, with origins dating back to 1974. They won a national title in 2021. They have had eleven head coaches since the team's inception. In the 2021 season, they ranked second in attendance among all Division 1 volleyball programs, averaging 7,540 fans over 15 regular season matches.

Elite Eight appearances 
The Badgers have reached the Elite Eight in the NCAA Division I women's volleyball tournament 13 times.

1997 
Under coach John Cook, the Badgers achieved a 30-3 overall record, which was the best record since the team's inception (until they reached 31–3 in 2021), the team had a bye to the second round, where they beat Central Florida 3–0, and in the Sweet Sixteen, the team beat Notre Dame 3–1. The team lost to Florida 3–2 in the Elite Eight.

1998 
The Badgers' overall record was 30–5, and reached the Elite Eight. The Badgers beat Arkansas-Little Rock 3–0 in the first round, San Diego 3–0 in the second round, and UCSB 3–2 in the Sweet Sixteen. The team lost to Nebraska 3–2 in the Elite Eight.

2000 
The Badgers, under head coach Pete Waite, reached the NCAA national final, finishing with an overall record of 33–4. The 7-seed Badgers defeated Bucknell 3–0 in the first round, Northern Iowa 3–1 in the second round, Kansas State 3–1 in the Sweet Sixteen, 15-seed UCLA 3–1 in the Elite Eight, and 3-seed USC 3–0 in the Final Four. The team fell just short of a national championship, falling to 1-seed Nebraska 3–2. The Nebraska side was coached by former Badgers head coach John Cook. Both Lizzy Fitzgerald and Sherisa Livingston made the Final Four All-Tournament team.

2004 
Following 2 consecutive second-round losses, the team found themselves in the Elite Eight again, finishing with an overall record of 22–10. The 14-seed Badgers defeated Loyola 3–0 in the first round, Notre Dame 3–0 in the second round, and 3-seed Hawaii 3–2 in the Sweet Sixteen, before being shut out by Stanford in the Elite Eight.

2005 
The following year, the team made the Elite Eight again, finishing with an overall record of 26–7. The 11-seed Badgers defeated Loyola 3–0 in the first round, California 3–0 in the second round, and 6-seed Notre Dame 3–2 in the Sweet Sixteen, before being knocked out by 3-seed and eventual champion Washington 3–0 in the Elite Eight.

2013 
Following a disappointing period (2008-2012) under Waite, head coach Kelly Sheffield, the former head coach of Albany and Dayton, was hired. In Sheffield's first season, the Badgers went 28–10. The 12-seed Badgers defeated Milwaukee 3–0 in the first round, California 3–0 in the second round, Florida State 3–1 in the Sweet Sixteen, and Purdue 3–1 in the Elite Eight. The team then became the lowest-seeded team to advance to the championship match, upsetting 1-seed Texas 3–1 in the Final Four. The "Cinderella" story, however, came to an end after being defeated by 2-seed Penn State in the championship. Deme Morales and Lauren Carlini made the Final Four All-Tournament team.

2014 

The following year, the team went 31–3, the best record the team had ever achieved up to this point. Entering the NCAA Tournament, the Badgers were seeded fourth. The Badgers defeated Western Michigan 3–0 in the first round, Illinois State 3–0 in the second round, and Ohio State 3–2 in the Sweet Sixteen. The Badgers were beaten, however, by 5-seed Penn State in the Elite Eight. Penn State would go on to win the tournament.

2016 
The team went 28–5, earning themselves a 3-seed in the NCAA Tournament. The Badgers defeated Howard 3–0 in the first round, Washington State 3–0 in the second round, and Ohio State 3–2 in the Sweet Sixteen. The team lost to 6-seed Stanford, the eventual winners, with a score of 3–2.

2018 
Following a Sweet 16 appearance in 2017, the Badgers reached the Elite Eight once again in 2018. Following an overall record of 25–7, the 6-seed Badgers beat Green Bay 3–0 in the first round, Pepperdine 3–1 in the second round, and San Diego 3–0 in the Sweet Sixteen. The team lost to 3-seed Illinois 3–1 in the Elite Eight.

2019 
The 2019 Badgers finished the season 27–7, and earned the fourth overall seed in the NCAA tournament. Wisconsin swept Illinois State, UCLA, 13th seeded Texas A&M, and fifth seeded Nebraska to reach the Final-4. The Badgers defeated top seeded Baylor 3–1 in its third Final-4 appearance. In the NCAA Championship, Wisconsin fell to third seeded Stanford 3–0.

2020 
In a season shortened by the COVID-19 pandemic and played in Spring 2021, the Badgers finished the season 18–1, and earned the #1 overall seed in the NCAA tournament. Wisconsin swept Weber State, & 16th seeded BYU, before defeating eighth seeded Florida 3–2 in the Elite Eight. In their fourth NCAA Final-4 appearance, Wisconsin fell to fourth seeded Texas 3–0.

2021 
The Badgers finished 31–3 on the season.  Ranked #1 in the Big Ten conference, the Badgers carried a #4 ranking into the tournament.

The Badgers swept their way to the Final Four, defeating Colgate, Florida Gulf Coast, #13 UCLA, and #12 Minnesota.

Semifinal Round:  The Badgers were able to take down the previously unbeaten #1 seed Louisville in the semi-final round of the tournament in a 5 set match.

Championship Round:  The Badgers pulled off the championship victory in a five-set thriller over #10 Nebraska. As a team, the Badgers posted 24 blocks, the most in a national championship. Rettke notched 11 kills and 13 blocks, while freshman Anna Smrek led offensively with 14 kills on .429 hitting, Jade Demps had 12 kills on .396 hitting, and Grace Loberg finished off her career with 10 kills. Sydney Hilley dished out 51 assists. Referencing: Michella Chester, NCAA reporting 12/18/2021

2022 
The Badgers finished the season 28-4, and earned the 3rd overall seed in the NCAA Tournament. The Badgers swept Quinnipiac, and TCU to advance to the Regionals for the 10th consecutive year. The Badgers defeated (4) Penn State 3-2 in the Sweet Sixteen, before falling to (2) Pitt 3-2 in the Elite Eight.

Results by season

All-Americans 
In all, Wisconsin has 27 total AVCA All-Americans, including four first team All-Americans. Among these four, Dana Rettke is the nation's only ever five-time first team All-American, largely due to the NCAA's decision not to count the 2020–21 school year, heavily disrupted by COVID-19, against the college eligibility of any women's volleyball player.

* denotes Big Ten Player of the Year

^ denotes AVCA National Player of the Year

First team

Second team

Third team

Other honors 
 Most Outstanding Player, NCAA Final Four: Anna Smrek – 2021

See also
List of NCAA Division I women's volleyball programs

References